Shwait Malik (born 29 April 1963) is an Indian politician belonging to the Bharatiya Janata Party. On 10 March 2016 he was the party's choice to represent Punjab in the Rajya Sabha, the Upper House of Indian Parliament. On 31 March 2018 he was appointed as Punjab BJP Chief. He is currently serving as the State Executive Member of BJP Punjab.

Shwait Malik has also served in the capacity of Mayor for the city of Amritsar, Punjab, India.

References
2. http://www.uniindia.com/ashwini-sharma-takes-charge-as-new-punjab-bjp-chief/north/news/1857146.html

1963 births
Living people
Bharatiya Janata Party politicians from Punjab
Mayors of places in Punjab, India
Politicians from Amritsar
Rajya Sabha members from Punjab, India
State Presidents of Bharatiya Janata Party